Emilijus Zubas (born 10 July 1990) is a Lithuanian footballer who plays as a goalkeeper for Israeli club Hapoel Tel Aviv.

Daugava Rīga

Before the start of the 2013 Latvian Higher League season Zubas signed a long-term contract with Daugava Rīga moving from the Lithuanian A Lyga club FK Ekranas. With Artūrs Vaičulis filling the first keeper's spot, Zubas was loaned out to the Polish Ekstraklasa club GKS Bełchatów. Despite remarkable individual performance his club was relegated from the Ekstraklasa and Zubas returned to Daugava Rīga. For the second half of the 2013 season he was loaned out to the Cypriot First Division club AEK Larnaca. Before the start of the 2014 season Zubas was loaned to the Danish Superliga club Viborg FF. In July 2014 Zubas was recalled from loan and filled in Daugava's entry for the UEFA Europa League match against Aberdeen. Following the match he was yet again sent out on loan, returning to his former club GKS Bełchatów.

GKS Bełchatów

After loan move to Poland in January 2013 he quickly became one of the best goalkeepers in the league. Although GKS Bełchatów won in the spring round up 25 points, they were relegated. Zubas repeatedly saved the team with spectacular parades and was called up to the Lithuanian national team. He was also chosen as the best goalkeeper of the 2012–13 Ekstraklasa season.

Successes
 Ekranas
A Lyga (2): (2011, 2012)
Lithuanian Football Cup (1): 2010–11.

Bnei Yehuda
Israel State Cup (2): 2016–17, 2018–19

References

External links
 
 
 

1990 births
Living people
Lithuanian footballers
Lithuania under-21 international footballers
Lithuania international footballers
Association football goalkeepers
FK Ekranas players
GKS Bełchatów players
FK Daugava (2003) players
AEK Larnaca FC players
Viborg FF players
Podbeskidzie Bielsko-Biała players
Bnei Yehuda Tel Aviv F.C. players
Adana Demirspor footballers
F.C. Arouca players
Hapoel Tel Aviv F.C. players
Danish Superliga players
Ekstraklasa players
Cypriot First Division players
Israeli Premier League players
TFF First League players
Primeira Liga players
Lithuanian expatriate footballers
Expatriate footballers in Latvia
Expatriate footballers in Poland
Expatriate footballers in Cyprus
Expatriate men's footballers in Denmark
Expatriate footballers in Israel
Expatriate footballers in Turkey
Lithuanian expatriate sportspeople in Latvia
Lithuanian expatriate sportspeople in Poland
Lithuanian expatriate sportspeople in Cyprus
Lithuanian expatriate sportspeople in Denmark
Lithuanian expatriate sportspeople in Israel
Lithuanian expatriate sportspeople in Turkey